Dennis Leman is a footballer who played as a midfielder in the Football League for Manchester City, Sheffield Wednesday, Wrexham and Scunthorpe United.

References

1954 births
Living people
Footballers from Newcastle upon Tyne
English footballers
Association football midfielders
Manchester City F.C. players
Sheffield Wednesday F.C. players
Wrexham A.F.C. players
Scunthorpe United F.C. players
Burton Albion F.C. players
English Football League players